Valvand (also known as Valūvand and Valvaland) is a village in Balatajan Rural District, in the Central District of Qaem Shahr County, Mazandaran Province, Iran. At the 2006 census, its population was 189, in 52 families.

References 

Populated places in Qaem Shahr County